"I'll Close My Eyes", first published in 1945, is a song written and composed by the English songwriter and bandleader Billy Reid. This song is usually performed with altered lyrics by the American songwriter Buddy Kaye.
The song has become a jazz standard.

Composition and recordings
The original version of the song had both music and lyrics written by Billy Reid. In this original version, the song is a song of regret, with a verse introducing the theme in words which include:  "Love was mine, you gave me a chance; But my heart was not content and I lost my romance.."  The main song refrain then begins (as it does in the later version) "I'll close my eyes" but continues "and make believe it's you". The song then continues on the theme that the singer has foolishly lost his love and can now only close his eyes and imagine her in his loneliness. It was recorded with the original Billy Reid words by the English singer Dorothy Squires, who had a close association with Billy Reid.

Soon after its release, new words were written for the Billy Reid tune by the American songwriter Buddy Kaye. The new words make the song more upbeat.  The initial phrase of the song remains "I'll close my eyes" but now it continues "...to everyone but you".  The song then continues on the theme that the singer will always be faithful, will "lock my heart to any other caress" and will close his eyes to see his love "through the years" in "those moments when we're apart". It thus becomes, not a song of loss, but a commitment to fidelity in a relationship which is expected to last. In this form, it was taken up by a number of singers. It was broadcast by Frances Langford with the new words as early as 1947, in a Maxwell House Radio Show.

The Jazz standard "I'll Close My Eyes" (with Buddy Kaye lyrics) has been covered by 50+ recording artists, including the Dinah Washington (and Quincy Jones Orchestra) recording that is licensed for soundtrack use in THE BRIDGES OF MADISON COUNTY (film) and Lee Daniels’ THE BUTLER (film).

List of recordings
Performers who have recorded the song in vocal or instrumental versions include:
 Dorothy Squires (with Billy Reid's original words) - 1945 
 Andy Russell - 1947
 Mildred Bailey - 1947
 Vic Damone - 1947
 Sarah Vaughan - 1957
 Dinah Washington - 1957
 Connie Francis. In 1959, Francis recorded both versions of the lyrics, with the same orchestral arrangement. The 1959 album released from this session was called My Thanks To You, and included only the original version of the lyrics; the recording with the later version of the lyrics was not released until 1993.
 Blue Mitchell - 1960
 Marilyn Michaels - 1965
 Joan Regan
 Dinah Shore
 Joanie Sommers
 Peggy Lee
 Cannonball Adderley and his orchestra
 Gene Ammons
 Ray Anthony
 Betty Scott
 Jimmy Beaumont
 Big Maybelle
 Bob Montgomery
 Donna Fuller
 Kenny Burrell
 Hank Crawford
 Barrett Deems
 Joan Griffith
 Johnny Desmond
 Anita Ellis
 Percy Faith
 George Shearing
 Von Freeman
 The Skyliners (original words)
 Renato Sellani
 Keith Jarrett
 Louis Smith
 Russell Gunn
 Ken McIntyre
 Peter Marshall
 Claire Martin
 Ken McIntyre
 Ted Heath
 Andreas Petterson
 Don Lusher
 Tony Monaco
 Buddy Morrow
 Little Jimmy Scott
 Dakota Staton
 Mark Murphy
 Tommy Newsom
 Diane Schuur
 Doug Raney
 Dizzy Reece
 Frank Sinatra
 Humphrey Lyttelton and his band
 KC and The Sunshine Band
 Eddie Fisher

References

1945 songs
Songs written by Billy Reid (British songwriter)
Songs with lyrics by Buddy Kaye
1940s jazz standards